Siwhe Mountain is a  summit located in British Columbia, Canada.

Description
It is the fifth-highest point in the Lillooet Ranges, and third-highest point in Stein Valley Nlaka'pamux Heritage Park. Precipitation runoff from the mountain drains north to Siwhe Creek, and south to Stein River, which are both tributaries of the Fraser River. The mountain's toponym was officially adopted October 6, 1936, by the Geographical Names Board of Canada, as suggested by W.H. Matthews, Geological Survey of Canada, on account of its proximity to Siwhe Creek. The first ascent of the mountain was likely made by prospectors.

Climate
Based on the Köppen climate classification, Siwhe Mountain is located in the marine west coast climate zone of western North America. Most weather fronts originate in the Pacific Ocean, and travel east toward the Coast Mountains where they are forced upward by the range (Orographic lift), causing them to drop their moisture in the form of rain or snowfall. As a result, the Coast Mountains experience high precipitation, especially during the winter months in the form of snowfall. Winter temperatures can drop below −20 °C with wind chill factors below −30 °C. This climate supports a small glacier in the peak's east cirque. The months July through September offer the most favorable weather for viewing or climbing Siwhe Mountain.

See also

 Geography of British Columbia
 Geology of British Columbia

References

External links
 Weather: Siwhe Mountain
 Siwhe Mountain (photo): Flickr 

Two-thousanders of British Columbia
Pacific Ranges
Kamloops Division Yale Land District
Coast Mountains
Lillooet Ranges